Maselli is a surname of Italian origin. Notable people with the surname include:

Francesco Maselli (born 1930), Italian film director and screenwriter
Domenico Maselli (1933–2016), Italian politician 
Claudio Maselli (born 1950), Italian footballer and manager
Sergio Maselli (born 2001), Italian footballer

Surnames of Italian origin